CUF is a neighborhood in Cincinnati, Ohio. Its name is derived from the communities of Clifton Heights, University Heights, and Fairview. CUF is bordered by the neighborhoods of Clifton, the University of Cincinnati, Mount Auburn, Over-the-Rhine, and Camp Washington.

University Heights occupies the northern area of CUF, and is separated from Fairview and Clifton Heights by Straight Street. Fairview occupies the south-west corner and Clifton Heights the south-east corner of CUF. Fairview and Clifton Heights are separated by Ravine Street; Fairview on the west, Clifton Heights on the east.

The population was 20,385 in the 2020 Census.

The term "CUF" is rarely, if ever, used by locals. Although inaccurate, these neighborhoods, along with Corryville, are often referred to as being part of Clifton, even by long-term residents.

Demographics

Source - City of Cincinnati Statistical Database

Clifton Heights
The residential area of Clifton Heights is largely rental property that functions as off-campus student housing, with many restaurants and convenience stores.

The Clifton Heights Business District of the fifties is completely gone and developed into businesses that cater to university students as there are few families remaining. Currently, the area has been  redeveloped into a contemporary mixed-use district featuring restaurants, bars, boutiques and an urban-style Target.  It is located in the area of McMillan Street and Calhoun Street between Vine/Jefferson and Clifton Avenue, immediately south of the University of Cincinnati campus. The architecturally significant St. George Church has been remodelled and is home to the Crossroads Church.  The former St. George School is now home to Corryville Catholic School.

Clifton Heights is home to the Hughes Center, a vocational and special-purpose high school.  Its current Clifton Heights location was built in 1906.  Currently there are five college prep schools housed at Hughes. The Paideia High School, the High School for Communications Professions and Health Professions, High School for Teaching and Technology and the Cincinnati Academy of Mathematics and Science (CAMAS).  Clifton Heights is also home to the Kreuck recreation complex, a large indoor recreation center which is located on the campus of the Hughes Center.  The Kreuck complex is a public facility operated by the Cincinnati Recreation Commission.  Bellevue Hill, a  city park located at Ohio Avenue, is well known for its overlook of downtown Cincinnati.

The Clifton Heights Community Urban Redevelopment Corporation (CHCURC) is committed to the revitalization of the Clifton Heights neighborhood. It was established as a partnership between the Clifton Heights Business Association, the Clifton Heights, University Heights, and Fairview Neighborhood Association, and the University of Cincinnati. CHCURC was responsible for the University Park Apartments development. 

Clifton Heights is sometimes called "Clifton," either intentionally shortened or not, by locals and non-locals. However, the actual Cincinnati neighborhood of Clifton is just north of CUF.

University Heights
University Heights is primarily a residential area, and like Clifton Heights and Fairview, there is an unusually high percentage of student-targeted rental property.  However, unlike the other two neighborhoods, there is also a large contingent of owner-occupied single-family houses.  University Heights is home to Good Samaritan Hospital, Hebrew Union College, as well as The Riddle Road Market.

Fairview
Fairview is a residential area, with a very high percentage of rental property targeted at University of Cincinnati students.  Many of these buildings are excellent examples of the Italianate form of architecture prominent in many of Cincinnati's older neighborhoods.

Fairview is known best as the former home of Fairvew German Language School, which was founded by the neighborhood's German community in 1888.  In 2008 however the school was relocated to nearby Clifton.

The neighborhood's name comes from the view much of the area has of downtown Cincinnati, as Fairview is perched on one of many hillsides facing the city proper.  Fairview Park, a  park located at McMillan Street, has a long driving path with numerous overlooks.

References

External links

Official Clifton Heights Community Site
CUF Neighborhood Association

Neighborhoods in Cincinnati